Robert George "Bobby" Richardson  (born February 24, 1944) is a former American and Canadian football player who played for the Denver Broncos and Hamilton Tiger-Cats. He won the Grey Cup with Hamilton in 1967. He previously played college football at the University of California, Los Angeles (UCLA) where he was teammates with defensive tackle Jimmy Sykes.

References

1944 births
Living people
Denver Broncos (AFL) players
Hamilton Tiger-Cats players
American football defensive backs
Canadian football defensive backs
UCLA Bruins football players
Players of American football from Minneapolis
Players of Canadian football from Minnesota